Patricia G. Turnbull (born 1952) is a poet from Saint Lucia. In 1991, she was awarded the Cedars Prize for Contemporary Poetry.

Life
Patricia Turnbull was born in Saint Lucia. She gained a BA at the University of the West Indies in 1974, and an MSc in English education from Syracuse University in 1986. She has worked as a business communication consultant, a Saint Lucian Creole translator and speech coach, and an English teacher and department chair. 

Turnbull won the Cedars Prize for Contemporary Poetry in 1991.

Man-made destruction of hillside plants – even before St Lucia was threatened by Hurricane Maria in 2017 – moved Turnbull to write a children's book, Ti Koko and Kush Kush (2018), about an unlikely friendship in a Caribbean garden. At the book's launch, Turnbull called for more community support for literary artists.<ref>'I think we are the most ignored' - Local author Dr Patricia G. Turnbull, Virgin Island News Online', 20 February 2018. Accessed 6 July 2020.</ref>

Works
 (ed.) Let's Take a Dip, by Alein O'Neil. Castries, St Lucia: UNESCO, 1984.
 (ed.) Boysie and the Genips, and other stories, by Jennie Wheatley. Kingston: UNESCO, 1984.
 Rugged Vessels: Poems, 1992
 Ti Koko and Kush Kush'', Philipsburg, St. Martin: House of Nehesi, 2018. Illustrated by Reuben Vanterpool.

References

1952 births
Living people
Saint Lucian women poets
Saint Lucian poets
Saint Lucian children's writers
University of the West Indies alumni
Syracuse University alumni